Evarcha aposto is a jumping spider species in the genus Evarcha that lives in Ethiopia and Nigeria. The male was first described in 2008.

References

Salticidae
Fauna of Ethiopia
Fauna of Nigeria
Spiders of Africa
Spiders described in 2008
Taxa named by Wanda Wesołowska